The Yucatán mushroomtongue salamander (Bolitoglossa yucatana), also known as the Yucatán salamander, is a species of salamander in the family Plethodontidae. It is found in the Yucatan Peninsula of Mexico and extreme northern Belize, possibly reaching into Guatemala.

It also occurs in disturbed habitat around villages. It is mainly terrestrial, living on the forest floor under surface debris, and in sink holes. However, it can also live in arboreal bromeliads. It is threatened by habitat loss. It occurs in the Calakmul Biosphere Reserve in Mexico and in the Shipstern Conservation & Management Area and Fireburn Nature Reserve in Belize.

References

Bolitoglossa
Amphibians of Belize
Amphibians of Mexico
Amphibians described in 1882
Taxa named by Wilhelm Peters
Taxonomy articles created by Polbot